9th Anniversary Show may refer to:

EMLL 9th Anniversary Show
ROH 9th Anniversary Show